Travares Arastius Tillman (born October 8, 1977) is a former American football safety and current coach. He played college football at Georgia Tech and was drafted by the Buffalo Bills in the second round of the 2000 NFL Draft. He is currently the defensive backs coach for Georgia Tech. 

Tillman has also been a member of the Houston Texans, Carolina Panthers and Miami Dolphins.

Early years
Tillman attended Toombs County High School in Lyons, Georgia, and he was a standout in football, basketball, and golf. In football, he was a standout wide receiver, and as a senior, he was a Class A All-State selection and the Class 3-A Defensive Player of the Year.

College years
Tillman attended Georgia Tech for four years.  AT TECH: Two-time all-conference defensive back . . . Elected one of Tech's permanent team captains for the 1999 season . . . Three-year starter in the secondary who played free safety, strong safety and cornerback . . . Started 35 of his last 37 games . . . Versatile player who started at strong safety as a sophomore and then moved to free safety last fall . . . Has the tools to excel at any position in the secondary . . . Has excellent speed and athletic ability . . . Covers well enough to play cornerback . . . Good tackler who excels at run support . . . Has the ability to make big plays, both in the secondary and on special teams . . . The first Tech player drafted in 2000 with his selection in the second round (58th pick) by the Buffalo Bills. Finished his career with 236 tackles to rank fourth in Tech history among defensive backs . . . Seven career interceptions and 17 pass breakups.

1999: Tech's top defensive player and a second-team all-Atlantic Coast Conference selection for the second straight year . . . Also named to the ACC All-Academic team after posting a 3.0 grade point average for the fall semester . . . Played both free safety and cornerback . . . Fifth on the team in tackles with 56. . . Missed two games (North Carolina and Duke) with a back injury . . . Started the first four games at free safety, but after his injury he played primarily cornerback . . . Season-high 10 tackles against Navy and Virginia . . . Had nine tackles, one tackle for loss and an interception in Tech's win over 16th-ranked Georgia . . . Intercepted Georgia's Quincy Carter at the Bulldogs' 26 and returned it to the 17 to set up a Tech touchdown one play later . . . Nine tackles and three pass breakups against top-ranked Florida State. Preseason all-Atlantic Coast Conference selection . . . Ranked the fifth-best free safety in the nation by The Sporting News preseason magazine . . . Also ranked among the nation's top ten safeties by Lindy's magazine, which tabbed him to its preseason all-Atlantic Coast Conference first team.

1998: Second-team all-Atlantic Coast Conference selection . . . The Jackets' second-leading tackler with 82 hits . . . Had one interception and was third on the team with seven pass breakups . . . Made seven 17 tackles and broke up a pass in Tech's Gator Bowl win over Notre Dame . . . Blocked a punt against NC State that Jason Bostic returned for a touchdown . . . Had nine tackles, one sack, one tackle for loss and one pass breakup in Tech's win over sixth-ranked Virginia . . . Career-high 11 tackles and a pass breakup at Clemson . . . Had eight tackles, a pass breakup and a fumble recovery in win at North Carolina . . . Added nine tackles against Florida State and eight hits and a pass breakup against Maryland . . . Shared the team's Outstanding Defensive Back honors with Jason Bostic. 1997: Started every game at strong safety and tied for the team lead in interceptions with four . . . Had an interception in each of the last three games . . . Tech's third leading tackler with 80, including 58 primary hits . . . Also credited with two tackles for loss, five pass breakups and a fumble recovery . . . Made one of the most spectacular plays of the season in Tech's win over 17th-ranked Clemson when, after a blocked punt, he picked off the ball in mid-air and returned it 30 yards for a touchdown . . . That was Tech's first blocked punt for a touchdown since 1987 . . . Also made six tackles in the game.

Outstanding game against 14th-ranked Georgia with a career-high 11 tackles, including one for a four-yard loss, a pass breakup and an interception at the Tech five yard line . . . Had another interception that would have ended Georgia's game-winning drive but it was nullified by a penalty . . . Intercepted a pass, which he returned 22 yards, and recovered a fumble against fifth-ranked North Carolina . . . Had an interception and 10 tackles against Maryland . . . Made seven tackles, with one tackle for loss, and intercepted a pass at the Tech six-yard line against Duke . . . Recorded eight tackles and broke up a pass against Wake Forest . . . Collected seven tackles and a pass breakup against Notre Dame . . . Added seven tackles and pass deflection against NC State, and six tackles and a breakup versus Florida State.

1996: True freshman who lettered as a backup and special teams performer . . . Played in nine of 11 games and totalled 18 tackles . . . Grabbed an interception at the goal line late in the fourth quarter against Duke, but fell back into the end zone for a safety . . . Also had two tackles against the Blue Devils while playing 23 snaps . . . Played well in his only start against Georgia in the season finale . . . Started at boundary cornerback and made a season-high seven tackles against the Bulldogs while playing 64 snaps . . . Added four tackles against Florida State and two versus Central Florida.

Professional Years
Career Transactions: Signed a two-year
contract with the Dolphins as an unrestricted free
agent from Carolina on March 4, 2005. . . Originally
drafted by Buffalo in the second round (58th overall) in

2000 . . . Was waived by the Bills on September 1,

2000 . . . Signed with Houston on January 14, 2003
...Was waived by the Texans on September 17, 2003,
and then claimed by Carolina a day later.

2006–Played in 14 games, including seven starts ...
Was inactive for two contests ...Recorded 42 tackles
and three passes defensed ...Added four tackles and
a forced fumble on special teams ...Opened the first
seven contests at strong safety before giving way to
Yeremiah Bell, starting with contest at Chicago (11/5)
. . . Had a season-high nine tackles at New England
(10/8), a figure which also equaled a career best ...Had two special teams stops and a forced
fumble in 13–10 win over Kansas City (11/12) ...Was inactive for Thanksgiving Day game at
Detroit (11/23) with a left hand injury sustained vs. Minnesota (11/19) ...Underwent surgery
on November 21 to reduce and stabilize a fourth metacarpal fracture of his left hand ...Also
was inactive for finale at Indianapolis (12/30) with a hamstring injury.
2005–Played in all 16 games, including 10 starts, in his first year with the Dolphins . . .
Registered 54 tackles, three interceptions and five passes defensed . . . Added five tackles
and a fumble recovery on special teams ...Three interceptions marked the second-highest
figure on the team, trailing only the four amassed by Lance Schulters, and were two more
than he had totaled in his previous four NFL campaigns ...Began the season as a reserve
. . . Moved into starting lineup at strong safety for game at New Orleans (10/30) following
season-ending pectoral injury to Tebucky Jones . . . In 27–24 win over Carolina (9/25),
recovered a Steve Smith fumbled punt at the Panthers’ 16, leading to an 18-yard TD pass
from Gus Frerotte to Randy McMichael two plays later ...Tied a career-high with nine tackles
vs. Atlanta (11/6) ...All three of his interceptions on the year came in consecutive weeks; vs.
New England (11/13), at Cleveland (11/20) and at Oakland (11/27) ...First interception as a
Dolphin occurred when he picked off a Tom Brady pass in the Patriots game and returned it
a career-long 22 yards ...In addition to his interception of a Charlie Frye pass in the Browns
game, matched his career-high figure of nine tackles, which also was a team high that day
. . . That three-game interception streak is tied with many others for the third-longest in
franchise history and was the longest since Patrick Surtain had one in games 2-4 of 2003
. . .Underwent surgery on June 14, 2005, to debride a medial meniscal tear and articular
cartilage damage ...The surgery was performed by Dr. George Caldwell at Broward General
Medical Center in Ft. Lauderdale ...
Consecutive Games With an Interception: Tillman tallied his three interceptions
in 2005 in consecutive weeks, including games vs. New England (11/13), at Cleveland (11/20)
and at Oakland (11/27) ...He picked off a Tom Brady pass in the third quarter of the Patriots
game for a 22-yard return, a Charlie Frye attempt in the fourth quarter of the Browns contest for
a 16-yard return and a Kerry Collins pass on the final play of the first half in the Raiders game in
which there was no return ...The streak is tied for the third-longest in Dolphins history:
Player Year (Games) No.
1. Dick Westmoreland 1967 (9-13) 5
2. Willie West 1966 (6-9) 4
3. Travares Tillman 2005 (9-11) 3
Many others 3
Longest Interception Streaks in Dolphins History

2004–Played in six games with the Panthers, including a start at free safety vs. San Diego
(10/24) ...Sustained a broken right arm in the Chargers game ...Was inactive for each of the
next two weeks before being placed on injured reserve on November 9 ...Finished the season
with five tackles on defense and a pair of stops on special teams.

2003–Began the season with Houston ...Was inactive for each of the first two games before
being waived by the Texans on September 17 ...Was claimed by the Panthers on September
18 and went on to play in seven regular season games, all in a reserve role ...Registered four
tackles on special teams ...Also saw action in a reserve role in Divisional Playoff game at St.
Louis (1/10/04) ...Was inactive for each of the Panthers’three remaining postseason contests.

2002–Was out of football after being released by the Bills on September 1.

2001–Started six of the 12 games in which he played at free safety with Buffalo ...Tallied 47
tackles, an interception, five passes defensed, a fumble recovery and a forced fumble ...Was
inactive for three of the final four games with a chest injury ...First career interception came
off a Mark Brunell pass at Jacksonville (10/18) in the game's final minute to preserve the Bills’
12–10 win . . . Established a career-high with nine tackles vs. Miami (11/25), when he also
recovered an Oronde Gadsden fumble (forced by Nate Clements) in the end zone to thwart a
Dolphins scoring drive ...Forced a fumble at San Francisco (12/2).

2000–Played in 15 games, including four starts, in his rookie season with the Bills . . .
Recorded 26 tackles and a pass defensed . . . First NFL start came at free safety vs. Miami
(12/3) as he responded with six tackles.

Coaching career

Georgia
After spending a few years coaching at the high school level, Tillman joined the University of Georgia’s coaching staff. He began as a graduate assistant for the Bulldogs working with the defensive backs his first two seasons with the program before transitioning into a quality control role with the defense for the 2018 season.

Colorado
Travares Tillman was hired on January 2, 2019, as the defensive backs coach for the University of Colorado, by new CU head coach Mel Tucker.

Michigan State
In 2020 he went with Mel to Michigan State where he worked as a defensive assistant before being promoted to cornerbacks coach for the 2021 season.

Georgia Tech
On December 7, 2021 it was announced that Tillman would return to his alma mater, Georgia Tech as the team’s defensive backs coach.

Personal life
Travares is the third of four children, born to Vera Pearl Tillman. 
In 2006 Travares married fashion designer and celebrity wardrobe stylist Kiki Tillman (Kirchner) and together the couple has three children. 

Travares earned his bachelor's degree in management from Georgia Tech in December 2010 upon his NFL retirement.

References

1977 births
Living people
American football safeties
American football wide receivers
Georgia Tech Yellow Jackets football players
Georgia Tech Yellow Jackets football coaches
Miami Dolphins players
Carolina Panthers players
Buffalo Bills players
Players of American football from Georgia (U.S. state)
People from Lyons, Georgia
Michigan State Spartans football coaches
Colorado Buffaloes football coaches
Georgia Bulldogs football coaches